Diplocolea is a genus of liverworts belonging to the family Solenostomataceae.

Species:
 Diplocolea sikkimensis Amakawa

References

Jungermanniales
Jungermanniales genera